Zarghamabad may refer to:
 Zarghamabad, Isfahan
 Zarghamabad, Kohgiluyeh and Boyer-Ahmad